Loch Dunvegan (Scottish Gaelic: Loch Dhùn Bheagain), is a sea loch on the west coast of the island of Skye in the Inner Hebrides of Scotland. Dunvegan, the village it was named after is located by its southern shore. The settlements of Galtrigill, Borreraig, Uig (Duirinish) and Colbost are located on its western shore. Claigan is located on its eastern shore.

References
 

Dunvegan
Dunvegan